Shang Zhixin (1636 – 1680) was a major figure in the early Qing Dynasty, known for his role in the Revolt of the Three Feudatories. He was Prince of Pingnan (平南王, "Prince who Pacifies the South"), inheriting his position from his father, the surrendered Ming Dynasty general Shang Kexi.

In 1673, Shang Kexi, on account of old age, requested the Kangxi Emperor to allow him to retire back in his adopted homeland Liaodong. He thus passed on his position to Shang Zhixin, who was his eldest son. As Prince of Pingnan, his duties were primarily concerned with the defence of Guangdong province.

Not long afterwards, the Qing court, as part of its policy of centralization, decided to abolish Pingnan Feudatory under the pretext that Shang Zhixin was "difficult to control". Shang Kexi, who was then still in Guangdong, was willing to accept this and made preparations to move his entire family back to Haicheng. 

However, the rebellion of the Pingxi and Jingnan feudatories, under Wu Sangui and Geng Jingzhong respectively, put an end to these plans. Shang Zhixin was ordered to give military command back to his father, who was still loyal to the Qing; however, many of his men deserted to the rebel camp. From 1673 to 1676, Guangzhou held out as a Qing fortress in the midst of rebel-held territory.

In early 1676, forces loyal to Shang Zhixin placed Shang Kexi under house arrest. Having gained the military command of Pingnan Feudatory, Shang Zhixin promptly joined Wu Sangui's forces. However, after Shang Kexi's death in late 1676 (and also following the surrender of rebel generals such as Wang Fuchen), Shang Zhixin changed his mind and defected back to the Qing. The Qing court ordered him to lead troops against Wu Sangui; but Shang Zhixin only made token efforts to that end, hoping to preserve his own forces.

In 1679, Kangxi stripped Shang Zhixin of much of his military powers. In 1680, with a Qing victory imminent, Shang Zhixin was arrested, brought to Beijing and ordered to commit suicide. In return for killing himself, Shang Zhixin's family was spared from punishment. There were thirty six brothers of Shang Zhixin, four of them were executed during Shang Zhixin's suicide while the rest of them were allowed to live.

Shang was known for his famously cruel reign. Some of his personal enemies were ripped apart by hunting dogs for opposing him.

References

 Shangshi Jiapu (The Family History of the Shang family)
 

Qing dynasty generals
1680 deaths
Forced suicides of Chinese people
Executed Qing dynasty people
Han Chinese Bordered Blue Bannermen
People executed by the Qing dynasty
17th-century births
Qing dynasty rebels